The Association Sportive Denguélé is an Ivorian football club based in Odienné.  Being a member of the Ivorian Football Federation Premiere Division since 2003, their best result was a third place in 2006. Thereby, the club was allowed to participate in the CAF Confederation Cup, but failed to defeat the Gambian side Banjul Hawks FC in the preliminary round.

Managers
Sékou Fofana
 Ben Sanou (2008–??)
 Vassiriki Savané

Performance in CAF competitions
CAF Confederation Cup: 1 appearance
2007 – Preliminary round

Football clubs in Ivory Coast
1972 establishments in Ivory Coast
Sports clubs in Ivory Coast
Sport in Denguélé District
Odienné
Association football clubs established in 1972